The Enormous Toroidal Plasma Device (ETPD) is an experimental physics device housed at the Basic Plasma Science Facility at University of California, Los Angeles (UCLA). It previously operated as the Electric Tokamak (ET) between 1999 and 2006 and was noted for being the world's largest tokamak before being decommissioned due to the lack of support and funding. The machine was renamed to ETPD in 2009. At present, the machine is undergoing upgrades to be re-purposed into a general laboratory for experimental plasma physics research.

As the Electric Tokamak

The Electric Tokamak (ET) was the last of a series of small tokamak machines built in 1998 under the direction of principal investigator and designer, Robert Taylor, a UCLA professor. The machine was designed to be a low field (0.25 T) magnetic confinement fusion device with a large aspect ratio. It is composed of 16 vacuum chambers made of 1-inch thick steel, with a major radius of 5 meters and a minor radius of 1 meter. The ET was the largest tokamak ever built at its time, with a vacuum vessel slightly bigger than that of the Joint European Torus.

The first plasma was achieved in January 1999. The ET is capable of producing a plasma current of 45 kiloamperes and can produce a core electron plasma temperature of 300 eV.

Four sets of independent coils are necessary for OH (ohmic heating) current drive, vertical equilibrium field, plasma elongation and plasma shaping (D or reverse-D). The OH system provides 10 V·s using a 10 kA power supply. Up to 0.1 T of vertical field can be applied for horizontal control and this is more than sufficient for all plasma configurations, including high beta. An additional set of coils provide a small horizontal field to correct for error field and to stabilize the plasma vertically. All the coils are located outside the vessel and are constructed out of aluminium.

A Rogowski probe outside the vessel and sets of Hall probes inside the vessel are used to monitor plasma current, position and shaping and are used in the control feedback loop. The poloidal system was designed using an in-house equilibrium code as well as a variety of other codes in order to cross-check computations and to assess the stability of the resulting plasma.

Like most tokamaks, the machine uses a combination of RF heating and neutral beam injection to drive and shape the plasma.

Decommission in 2006

In 2006, the ET had run out of funding and was decommissioned following the retirement of Taylor.  Factors leading to loss of funding are attributed to the lack of extensive plasma diagnostics, its large size, and its place in the politics of fusion. When it was operating, the ET was funded mostly by the Department of Energy (DOE).

As the Enormous Toroidal Plasma Device 
In 2009, the Electric Tokamak (ET) was renamed to the Enormous Toroidal Plasma Device (ETPD) and was re-purposed for basic plasma research. A lanthanium hexaboride (LaB6) plasma source was developed for the ETPD (similar to the one used in the Large Plasma Device), and is capable of producing a long column of magnetized plasma (~100 m) that winds itself multiple times along the toroidal axis of the machine. The plasma column was shown to be current-free and terminates on the neutral gas within the chamber without touching the machine walls.

The typical operational parameters of the ETPD are:

 Density: n ≤ 3 × 1013 cm−3
 Electron Temperature: 5 eV < Te < 30 eV 
Ion Temperature 1 eV < Ti < 16 eV
 Background field: B = 250 gauss (25 mT)
Plasma beta: β ~ 1

The ETPD is currently in the process of being upgraded (i.e. larger sources, better diagnostic capabilities) to support a wide range of plasma physics experiments.

See also 
 Large Plasma Device, a linear plasma device housed in the same facility as the ETPD

References

External links
"Installation and Initial Testing of the Electric Tokamak Folded Waveguide"  with photos.
UCLA Electric Tokamak Homepage
UCLA Tokamak Research

Plasma physics
Plasma physics facilities
Tokamaks
University of California, Los Angeles